Full Stop is an experimental electro/folk album released in 2000 by Annabelle Chvostek.  It attained a #7 position on college radio charts in Canada after a limited release in 2000 of 150 copies.

Track listing
"Icy blue"
"Messages get through"
"Body Work"
"Gray's Pussycat Edie"
"Chills"
"Blows me away"
"La La La"
"Booby Boo"
"That in itself"

External links
 Album description from annabelle.org

Annabelle Chvostek albums
2000 albums